The Donauinsel (Danube Island) is a long, narrow artificial island in central Vienna, Austria, lying between the Danube river and the parallel excavated channel Neue Donau ("New Danube"). The New Danube waterway is practically an elongated (swimming) lake, technically a diluvian bed. It has been described as an "autobahn for swimmers", due to the number of people in Vienna who own amphibious cars.

Recreation and festival venue
To most visitors, the island is known as a recreational area with bars, restaurants and nightclubs. It has sports opportunities from rollerblading, cycling and swimming to canoeing. There is one beach that, in its beginning, felt so exotic that it was soon nicknamed the "Copa Cagrana" as a humoristic allusion to Rio de Janeiro's Copacabana: Kagran is the part of the 22nd District of Vienna next to that beach. In the southern and northern parts of the island, there are extensive (and free) nude beaches.

The Donauinselfest is an internationally well-known annual open air festival, and Europe's biggest event of this kind, with over 3 million visitors. It takes place at the end of June (Friday through Sunday) – except for 2008 (September 5–7), due to Austria (and Switzerland) hosting the European Football Championship.  On September 23, 2008, Madonna gave her first concert in Austria there in front of a crowd of 57,000.

Reliable flood protection

The main purpose of the island however is to be part of Vienna's highly sophisticated flood protection system.  As the river Danube crosses the city (before major extensions: passed nearby), this has been a constant concern over hundreds of years. The first notable protective measures were taken between 1870 and 1875. A central bed, 280 m, was dug out, and an inundation area of 450 m was created at the river's left bank.

In 1970, a new plan was conceived and soon executed: digging an additional channel to replace the former inundation area, and using the spoil to build up the remaining strip of land between the straightened bed from the 19th century flood defense schemes and the newly created one. The new channel is called the Neue Donau (New Danube). After the completion of the works it was envisaged that the resulting island should eventually be used for recreation. The flood control system is designed to protect from flash floods bringing river flows of up to 14,000 m3 per second. This has only happened once in Vienna's history; in 1501. The heavy 2002 flood brought flows of 10,000 m3 per second. It includes the Danube Canal's historic Nußdorf watergate, locks at either end of New Danube, a groundwater level control system integrated into the right bank flood levee (which creates appropriate conditions for the large park area Prater, once part of a wide alluvial forest zone), and the new Freudenau river plant's sluice.

The works were started in March 1972
and finished in 1988.
The river plant was added from 1992 to 1998.

Notes

References and other external links 

 Donautech, Donauinsel datasheet, webpage: Official datasheet (German).
Danube Island Vienna Informations and photographs from the Citymagazin www.wien-konkret.at
Copa Cagrana at night (JPG, 22k)
Danube Island Free Festival – Official information, English.

Maps 
 Vienna map showing Danube Island (English): 2008, webpage:MapAustria-Vienna.
 Simple Interactive Vienna tourist map linked to a short English descriptions of Danube Island and other Vienna tourist spots.
 Better Map of the island, by Vienna magistrate; it consists of 8 GIFs, c.100k each.

Islands of the Danube
Klosterneuburg
Floridsdorf
Donaustadt
Landforms of Vienna
River islands of Austria
Nude beaches